Christopher James McAlister (born June 14, 1977) is a former American college and professional football player who was a cornerback in the National Football League (NFL) for eleven seasons.  He played college football for the University of Arizona, and was recognized as an All-American.  He was drafted by the Baltimore Ravens in the first round of the 1999 NFL Draft, and played for the Ravens for ten seasons before playing his final season with the New Orleans Saints.

Early years
McAlister was born in Pasadena, California, and attended Pasadena High School. As a high school football quarterback, he threw for 1,153 yards and rushed for 1,302 yards and also returned three punts and two interceptions for touchdowns.  He won the conference player of the year and California's Most Valuable Player award in his senior year.  McAlister also played basketball and, under Coach Bill Duwe, won the CIF championship in 1995. He also lettered in track.  Pasadena High School retired his football jersey No. 9 in 2001.

College career
McAlister originally committed to UCLA, where his father James was a star running back in the 1972-73 seasons. McAllister went to  Mt. San Antonio College  before transferring to the University of Arizona and playing for the Arizona Wildcats football team from 1996 to 1998.  He had an illustrious career at Arizona where he won unanimous All-America first-team honors and was a first-team All-Pac-10 selection for 3 straight seasons. He is only the 7th player in college football history (1st in Arizona history) to return a kickoff, punt and interception for touchdowns in the same season. His 18 interceptions at the end of his Arizona career ranked 3rd on the school's career-record chart behind Chuck Cecil and Jackie Wallace.

Professional career

Pre-draft
McAlister, at 205 pounds, ran a 4.53 second 40-yard dash, 4.08 second 20-yard shuttle, 6.90 3-cone drill, and had a vertical jump of 38 inches at the 1999 NFL Combine

Baltimore Ravens
The Baltimore Ravens selected Chris McAlister in the first round of the 1999 NFL Draft, as the tenth overall pick.

McAlister had a solid rookie season in which he recorded 47 tackles (45 solo), 5 interceptions, and 16 passes deflected. He made his NFL debut at the St. Louis Rams on September 12, 1999. At season's end, he was named to College & Pro Football Newsweekly's 1999 All-Rookie Team. McAlister had another solid season in 2000 as the Ravens won the Super Bowl and he had a key interception in Super Bowl XXXV against the New York Giants. During the regular season, he also intercepted New York Jets and former Baltimore Ravens QB Vinny Testaverde and returned it 98 yards for a touchdown.

McAlister set an NFL record for the longest play when he returned a missed field goal 107 yards for a touchdown during Monday Night Football against the Denver Broncos on September 30, 2002. This record was later broken by Nathan Vasher on a 108-yard field goal return, tied by Devin Hester and eventually broken again by Antonio Cromartie on a 109-yard field goal return in 2007.

McAlister earned his first Pro Bowl selection in 2003. He had 43 tackles. McAlister also intercepted three passes for 93 yards. That included an 83-yard run for a score.

In 2004, McAlister signed a 7-year, $55 million contract. 

McAlister had arguably the best season of his career in 2006. He had two touchdowns that year and made his third Pro Bowl. But his last two seasons in Baltimore were marked by injuries and inconsistent play. In 2008, in 5 starts before being put on Injured Reserve, he did however amass 16 tackles, 3 INTs and 1 fumble recovery, showing some of his old form.

Chris McAlister had his contract terminated by the Baltimore Ravens on February 16, 2009.

New Orleans Saints
On November 17, 2009, McAlister signed with the New Orleans Saints. In a December 6 game at the Washington Redskins, McAlister forced a fumble in overtime, which started the drive resulting in a game-winning field goal for New Orleans. However, he was released on December 8, just two months before the Saints would go on to win Super Bowl XLIV. McAlister finished 2009 with 4 tackles and the forced fumble.

NFL statistics

Regular season

Postseason

Personal life
Chris McAlister's father James McAlister also played in the NFL, in three seasons for the New England Patriots and Philadelphia Eagles during the 1970s. McAlister is divorced and has one daughter. McAlister was married for three months.

References

External links
Baltimore Ravens bio

1977 births
Living people
All-American college football players
American Conference Pro Bowl players
American football cornerbacks
Arizona Wildcats football players
Baltimore Ravens players
Mt. SAC Mounties football players
New Orleans Saints players
Players of American football from Pasadena, California
Pasadena High School (California) alumni